Alden is an island in Askvoll Municipality in Vestland County, Norway. The  island lies off the mainland coast of the Sunnfjord region. The residents of the island live on the southern shore of the island. The only access to the island is by boat. There are no regular ferries that stop at the island.

The mountain dominates the island, giving it very steep coastlines. The only habitable area is on a small flat coastal area on the southern shore. The towering mountain is a familiar landmark to the fishermen who have sailed the local waters for centuries.

See also
List of islands of Norway

References

Islands of Vestland
Askvoll